A Trivision, also called three-message sign, is a billboard/sign that consists of triangular prisms placed inside a frame. The prisms rotate 120°, each showing a new message of advertisement and/or information. As implied, three individual images, or messages, can be displayed on a Trivision.

The Trivision is most commonly used as a commercial sign and is used both indoors and outdoors. Trivision billboards are commonly found along highways and in city centers. The changing messages on the rotating prisms are intended to catch the attention of its viewer. Many individual studies that have been made in different countries, shows that the movement within a Trivision attracts attention and increases brand impact.

The basic principle was used to change scenes in ancient Greek theatre with wooden prism devices known as Periaktos.

The first U.S. patent using this principle in a motorized display was issued in 1901. In 1950 many suppliers existed in USA. Today the product exists all over the world and can be built in all size and shapes such as curved, giant sizes, city format, on walls, in landscape format, portrait format, and over bridges.

The sign can be used on-demand, meaning the correct message will appear when the command is given to the sign. Commonly these signs are used in traffic and often called “Variable Message Sign” (VMS). A VMS can be used for directional, speed limit, warning, parking guidance and toll booths. The VMS can also be used in advertising for applications, such as morning- and/or evening-messages.

Other names of this sign include: Tri-Face, Three Message Sign, Prismavision, Prismatic displays, Rotapanel.

References 

Billboards
Signage